Woodside Barracks is an Australian Army base located in  Woodside in South Australia.

History
The base was established in 1927, and known as Woodside Camp. The camp was used for the training of light horse and infantry units of the Citizens Military Force (CMF). With the outbreak of the Second World War, barracks buildings were constructed to accommodate up to four infantry battalions. The 2/10th, 2/43rd and 2/48th battalions of the Second Australian Imperial Force were formed at the camp. The base also provided training facilities for several CMF units and provided temporary accommodation for elements of the United States Army's 32nd Infantry Division when it first arrived in Australia in May 1942. The camp was converted into a refugee reception camp in 1949 and could house up to 3,000 people. After being vacated the camp was again pressed into military service.
It was the home of 2 Field Ambulance, RAAMC before if moved to Ingleburn, NSW, and 3rd Bn Royal Australian Regiment from 14 Oct 1965 in the Kapyong Lines during its period of service in South Viet Nam and after before the move to Holsworthy in 1982.  It was also the location of the School of Military Intelligence in late 1960s.

Woodside Barracks is currently home to the 16th Regiment, Royal Australian Artillery.

See also
List of Australian military bases

References

http://www.3rar.com.au/3rarhistory.html#a65
Australian Army bases
Military installations in South Australia